Parliamentary elections were held in Ecuador on 3 June 1962.

Results

References

Elections in Ecuador
1962 in Ecuador
Ecuador
Election and referendum articles with incomplete results